Camena is a rural locality in the local government area of Central Coast, in the North West region of Tasmania. The 2016 census determined a population of 26 for the state suburb of Camena.

History
Prior to 1910 the area was known as South Road. Camena is an Aboriginal word for “chin”. The locality was gazetted in 1966.

Geography
The Blythe River forms the western boundary.

Road infrastructure
The C116 route (Camena Road) enters from the north and exits to the west. Route C192 (Scotts Road) starts at an intersection with C116 near the western boundary and runs generally south-east before exiting to the south.

References

Localities of Central Coast Council (Tasmania)
Towns in Tasmania